Miss Teen USA 2007, the 25th Miss Teen USA pageant, was held on August 24, 2007 in Pasadena, California. At the conclusion of the final night of the competition Hilary Cruz of Colorado was crowned Miss Teen USA 2007 by outgoing titleholder Katie Blair of Montana.

The event was hosted by Mario Lopez, who also hosted Miss Teen USA 1998 and Miss Teen USA 2003.  In 2007 he also hosted the Miss America and Miss Universe pageants. The pageant was broadcast on NBC at 8:00 p.m. EST, rather than at 9:00 p.m. EST.

To date, it was the final Miss Teen USA pageant to be televised on broadcast television due to NBC failing to renew its contract. Since then, it is broadcast over the Internet on the pageant's official website, its YouTube channel and on Microsoft's Xbox Live service.

Results

Placements

Historical significance 
 Colorado wins competition for the first time. Also becoming in the 23rd state who wins Miss Teen USA.
 New Jersey earns the 1st runner-up position for the first time.
 North Carolina earns the 2nd runner-up position for the first time.
 South Carolina earns the 3rd runner-up position for the first time. 
 West Virginia earns the 4th runner-up position for the first time.
 States that placed in semifinals the previous year were Kansas, New Jersey, North Carolina, Rhode Island, South Carolina and Virginia.
 Kansas and Virginia placed for the third consecutive year.
 New Jersey, North Carolina, Rhode Island and South Carolina made their second consecutive placement.
 Illinois, Minnesota, New Mexico and West Virginia last placed in 2005.
 Alabama, Hawaii and Tennessee last placed in 2004.
 Colorado and Wyoming last placed in 1998.
 Michigan and Oklahoma break an ongoing streak of placements since 2005.
 Georgia and Maryland break an ongoing streak of placements since 2004.

Events
Contestants arrived in Pasadena on August 12 and participated in a number of events in the lead up to the final competition.  On August 14 the official swimsuit poster shoot was held by the pool of the Pasadena Hilton, the host hotel.

Competition rounds

Finals
The top fifteen was announced during the final telecast and went on to compete in the swimsuit competition, which featured music by Kat DeLuna. Following this the top ten delegates were announced and they competed in evening gowns, to music by the Jonas Brothers. After this, the two special award winners were announced, followed by the announcement of the top five delegates. The interview competition involved the top five answering a question proposed by one of the judges. Each delegate had 30 seconds to answer. Afterwards the judges had one final look at the top five  as they cast their votes for the winner and runners-up. Katie Blair then took her final walk and the runners-up and winner was announced.

During the Final Question round, Aimee Teegarden asked Miss South Carolina, Caitlin Upton, why she thought a fifth of Americans are unable to locate the United States on a world map.  Upton's response was: I personally believe that, U.S. Americans are unable to do so, because some… people out there in our nation that don’t have maps, and I believe that our education, like such as in South Africa and  the Iraq, everywhere like such as, and I believe
that they should… our education over here in the U.S., should help the U.S., er, should help South Africa and should help the Iraq and the Asian countries so we will be able to build up our future. For our children.

The following Tuesday, August 28, Upton appeared on NBC's Today Show, where Ann Curry gave her the opportunity to formulate a new response to the same question.  Upton's new reply was:  "Personally, my friends and I, we know exactly where the United States is on our map.  I don’t know anyone else who doesn’t. If the statistics are correct, I believe there should be more emphasis on geography in our education so people will learn how to read maps better." She said that she was "in shock" during the competition and barely heard the question that had been asked.

Delegates
The Miss Teen USA 2007 delegates were:

Contestant gallery

Contestant notes

Most delegates won their state crown on the first attempt; however, eight contestants had competed previously.
California, Florida, New Jersey, North Carolina, South Carolina and Texas won their state crowns on their second attempt. California placed 4th runner up in the 2006 Miss California Teen USA pageant. Florida was unplaced in the 2006 Miss Florida Teen USA pageant. New Jersey was a semi-finalist in the Miss New Jersey Teen USA 2006 pageant. North Carolina placed 4th runner-up in 2006's Miss North Carolina Teen USA pageant. South Carolina placed 3rd runner-up in the 2006 Miss South Carolina Teen USA pageant. Lastly, Texas placed as 1st runner-up in 2006's Miss Texas Teen USA pageant.
Maryland won her state title at her third attempt. She previously placed 3rd runner-up in the 2006 Miss Maryland Teen USA pageant and was unplaced at the 2005 pageant.
Miss Washington Teen USA, Shalane Larango, was the first delegate to cross over from the Miss America's Outstanding Teen pageant to compete in Miss Teen USA. Shalane was Miss Washington's Outstanding Teen 2005 and placed 2nd runner up in the Miss America's Outstanding Teen 2005 pageant.
Jena Sims (Georgia) was Miss National Junior Teenager 2005.
Caitlin Klug (Michigan) competed in the National American Coed circuit, winning several Michigan titles; the Junior Miss America circuit; and the National American Miss circuit.
Alyssa Campanella (New Jersey) was Miss California USA 2011 and went on to win Miss USA 2011. Katie Blair, Miss Teen USA 2006 who crowned the winner at this pageant, succeeded Campanella as Miss California USA.

See also
Miss USA 2007
Miss Universe 2007

Notes

References

2007
August 2007 events in the United States
2007 beauty pageants
2007 in California